Calle Kristiansson (born July 5, 1988 in Kristianstad) is a Swedish singer, who came first runner-up in Idol 2009 after the winner Erik Grönwall.

Music
One of the songs he performed in the Idol 2009 competition, Marc Cohn's "Walking in Memphis", was featured on the 12-track "Best of Idol 2009" compilation CD, and three other 2010 compilations. On December 23, 2009, Kristiansson released his first studio album, containing 11 songs from his performances on Idol.

He toured during 2010 with his band Calle & The Undervalleys. In 2011 they were credited by event organizers in one news report with "saving the festival" in the town of Hörby, when the headlining band was fired due to a conviction on a minor drugs charge.
The band released their new album "Valley Rally" in June 2011. The band was featured at a 2012 four-day free festival in Kristianstad.

Discography

Albums
Solo
2009: Calle Kristiansson
2013: Once in Kristianopel

As  Calle & The Undervalleys
2010: Shades of Blue
2011: Valley Rally

Singles
Solo
2009: "Walking in Memphis"
2013: "Where life begun"

As Calle & the Undervalleys
2010: "Stars"
2011: "Lonely mothers holy land"
2012: "Back in the fast line"

Artist Collaborations
2010: "Target" with The Playtones
2011: "Echoes" with Ida Seve
2012: "Fairytale of Ney York" with Maryjet

In compilation albums
2009: "Walking in Memphis" in Det bästa från Idol 2009

References

1988 births
Living people
People from Kristianstad Municipality
Idol (Swedish TV series) participants
21st-century Swedish singers
21st-century Swedish male singers